This is a list of diplomatic missions of Fiji, which are maintained by the country's Ministry of Foreign Affairs and International Cooperation.

Americas

 Washington, D.C. (Embassy)
 Los Angeles (Trade Office)

Asia

 Beijing (Embassy)
 Shanghai (Consulate-General)

 New Delhi (High Commission)

 Jakarta (Embassy)

 Tokyo (Embassy)

 Kuala Lumpur (High Commission)

 Seoul (Embassy)

 Abu Dhabi (Embassy)

Europe

 Brussels (Embassy)

 London (High Commission)

Oceania

 Canberra (High Commission)
 Sydney (Consulate-General) 

 Wellington (High Commission)

 Port Moresby (High Commission)

Multilateral organisations
 
New York City (Permanent Mission)
 Geneva (Permanent Mission)

Gallery

See also
 Foreign relations of Fiji
 List of diplomatic missions in Fiji
 Visa policy of Fiji

References
Ministry of Foreign Affairs and External Trade

List
Diplomatic missions
Fiji